Coast Highway is a station in Oceanside, California. It is served by North County Transit District's Sprinter light rail line. The station is located at 1304½ S. Tremont Street. It consists of a single platform and track.

Platforms and tracks

References

External links
SPRINTER Stations

North County Transit District stations
Railway stations in the United States opened in 2008
Oceanside, California